is an active stratovolcano in the Shikotsu-Toya National Park, Hokkaido, Japan.  It has erupted four times since 1900: in 1910 (which created Meiji-shinzan), 1944–45 (which created Shōwa-shinzan), August 7, 1977, and on March 31, 2001. To the north lies Lake Tōya. Mount Usu formed on the southern rim of the caldera containing the lake.

Mount Usu and Shōwa-shinzan are major tourist attractions in the Shikotsu-Toya National Park.  A ropeway on Mount Usu takes visitors to viewing platforms overlooking Shōwa-shinzan.  The 1977 eruption is mentioned in passing in Alan Booth's travelogue, The Roads to Sata. The 2008 G8 Summit was held near Mount Usu at Lake Tōya.

See also
 List of volcanoes in Japan
 Usuzan Ropeway
 List of mountains in Japan

References

External links 

 Usuzan—Japan Meteorological Agency 
 
 Usu Volcano—Geological Survey of Japan
 
 Toya-Usu UNESCO Global Geopark

Usu
Usu
Shikotsu-Tōya National Park
Usu
Usu
Usu